Noviherbaspirillum canariense is a Gram-negative bacterium which was isolated from old volcanic mountain soil on Tenerife on the Canary Islands.  Phylogenetic analysis has shown it belongs to the genus  Noviherbaspirillum. N. canariense is able to produce siderophores in vitro like N. seropedicae.

References

Burkholderiales
Bacteria described in 2012